Susan Anderson (1870–1960) was the first woman to practice medicine in Colorado.

Susan or Sue Anderson may also refer to:

 Susan Anderson (psychotherapist) (born 1946), author of self-help books on failed romantic relationships
 Susan Anderson (swimmer) (born 1948), American swimmer

See also
 Susan Andersen (born 1950), American writer of romance novels